This was a tennis rivalry  played between British player Arthur Gore and the New Zealand player Anthony Wilding, which in their respective careers met 14 times from 1905 until 1912.

Gore and Wilding were both former World number 1 and both Grand Slam winners  with Gore winning three slam titles and two olympic golds and Wilding winning six slam titles and three world championship titles both Davis Cup champions.

They first met in 1905 at the East Surrey Championships in the neighborhood of East Croydon in Croydon (now part of Greater London). Gore was 37 years old when he first met 22 years old Wilding. At the Grand Slam tournaments they met four times all at Wimbledon and were tied (2-2) in matches they met in the quarter finals and semi finals twice and two times in the challenge round, Wilding was the challenger to Gore defending the title in 1910 with Wilding winning two years later in 1912 roles reversed and Gore was the challenger with Wilding successfully defending his tile.

They played each other predominately on grass courts but also on clay courts and indoors on wood courts (the fastest courts ever) so on three very different surfaces.

Challenge rounds
Challenge Round : the championship round of a tournament, in which the winner of a single-elimination tournament phase (called then The All-Comers' Tournament), challenges the holder of the tournament (the winner of the last edition, often the previous year but not always, of the tournament) who plays only that last match to decide the new champion. The challenge round was used in the early history of tennis in many tournaments, but not all, from 1878 through 1921 (in 1876 and 1877 there was no challenge rounds given that the first tournaments were created). The Challenge Round system was still used later for nations in the Davis Cup until 1971 included.

Head-to-head

Official matches (Gore 9–5 Wilding)

Breakdown of their rivalry
All matches: Gore, 9–5
Outdoor courts: Gore, 6-5
Clay courts: Wilding, 1–0
Grass courts: Gore, 6–4
Indoor hard courts: Gore, 3–0
Grand Slam matches: Tied, 2–2
Grand Slam finals: Wilding, 2–0
Davis Cup matches: Gore, 1-0
All finals: Gore, 5–3

See also
List of tennis rivalries

References

Sources
https://app.thetennisbase.com/Wilding v Gore, head to head matches 1905-1912.

External links
Official site: http://www.anthonywilding.com/

Tennis rivalries
Tennis in New Zealand
Tennis in England